Dave Vankoughnett (born April 1, 1966) is a former professional Canadian football offensive lineman who played eleven seasons in the Canadian Football League.

References 

Winnipeg Football Club Hall of Fame Biography.

1966 births
Living people
Boise State Broncos football players
Canadian football offensive linemen
Sportspeople from Kamloops
Players of Canadian football from British Columbia
Winnipeg Blue Bombers players